The CUNY School of Professional Studies (CUNY SPS) is a public university and is part of the City University of New York (CUNY).

History

In June of 2003, Neil Kleiman, then-director of the Center for an Urban Future, addressed the Board of Trustees of the City University of New York detailing the need for creating the CUNY School of Professional Studies (CUNY SPS).

In 2013, CUNY SPS opened its principal campus in midtown Manhattan, at the former site of the Gimbels department store.

CUNY SPS became CUNY’s first and leading campus to offer fully online degree programs at both the bachelor's and master's level. In 2022, for the second year in a row, the U.S. News & World Report  named CUNY SPS in the top ten of their nationwide list of Best Online Bachelor’s Programs. Ranked #10 in the nation out of 358 schools assessed, with a score of 94 out of 100, CUNY SPS is the highest listed in New York State. Additionally, U.S. News & World Report ranked CUNY SPS #5 in the nation on the publisher’s 2022 list of Best Online Bachelor’s Programs for Veterans, moving up one spot from 2021.

Programs
The following list contains the names of the CUNY School of Professional Studies programs that have been registered with the New York State Education Department (NYSED) under the CUNY Graduate School and University Center and assigned HEGIS code numbers in compliance with State requirements.

 An online bachelor's in psychology that has been ranked #2 in the nation on the 2022 list of Best Online Bachelor’s Programs in Psychology by U.S. News & World Report.
 Other online bachelor's degrees include business (30th nationwide ranking from U.S. News & World Report), communication and media, disability studies, health information management, sociology, and more. 
 The nursing bachelor's and the master's degrees are additionally accredited by the Commission on Collegiate Nursing Education.
 Master's degrees in applied theater and youth studies with fully online master's degrees in data analytics, business management, disability studies, disability services in higher education, psychology and more.
 Credit courses in a variety of areas, including project management, immigration law, and healthcare administration.
 Customized training programs for government agencies, unions, and nonprofit organizations

Alumni
CUNY SPS has over 6,000 alumni who work principally in the healthcare and business sectors.  While the majority of its alumni reside in the United States, the school has vast alumni representation in the Czech Republic, Kenya, India, Serbia, and Slovakia.

References

External links
CUNY School of Professional Studies
John F. Kennedy, Jr. Institute for Worker Education 

Professional Studies
Universities and colleges in Manhattan